Grand Ayatollah Mohammad Ali Araki (22 December 1894 in Arak –  24 November 1994 in Qom) was an Iranian Twelver Shia Marja'. Araki was teacher of many Iranian revolutionary person and was the last survivor from Ruhollah Khomeini's era. When he died, IRNA declared that "he was considered the greatest living Marja'".

Biography 
Mohammad Ali Araki was born in 1894 in Arak, Iran. He started his education from Arak Hawza. Grand Ayatollah Haeri allowed him to wear the turban and robe because qualified individuals were limited. Also, Araki studied many years in Yazd Hawza. After that he migrated to Qom and continued his studying under supervision of Abdul-Karim Ha'eri Yazdi. After the death of Ruhollah Khomeini, Ayatollah Mohammad-Reza Golpaygani was selected by Society of Seminary Teachers of Qom as Marja' for Khomeini's followers and after Golpaygani's death Araki was introduced. So, Araki was the last survivor from Ruhollah Khomeini's era.

Death 
Ayatollah Araki died on 24 November 1994 at the age of 99. He was buried in Qom's Fatima Masumeh Shrine.

See also

 List of Maraji

References

External links 
 Photos of Ayatollah Mohammad Ali Araki

1894 births
1994 deaths
Iranian ayatollahs
People from Arak, Iran
Grand ayatollahs
Burials at Fatima Masumeh Shrine